Paddock Township is one of thirty-seven townships in Holt County, Nebraska, United States. The population was 68 at the 2020 census. A 2021 estimate placed the township's population at 68.

Paddock Township was named for Algernon Paddock, a U.S. Senator from Nebraska.

Paddock Township is the site of a small settlement on the Niobrara River called Paddock.  From 1876 to 1879 this settlement was the county seat of Holt County.

See also
County government in Nebraska

References

External links
City-Data.com

Townships in Holt County, Nebraska
Townships in Nebraska